The Berkeley I-80 bridge also known as the University Avenue pedestrian bridge and the Berkeley Marina overpass is a -wide bridge spanning the Eastshore Freeway (Interstate 80/580) in Berkeley, California. It forms part of the San Francisco Bay Trail.

History
The bridge was constructed to allow bicycles, pedestrians, and wheelchair users access to the Berkeley Marina, Eastshore State Park, and the city. In the city records, the bridge is referred to as the "City of Berkeley Eastshore Pedestrian Overcrossing". The bridge has two lanes for bikes and a raised sidewalk and is wide enough to carry emergency vehicles.

Opened on February 27, 2002, the bridge was built at a cost of $6.4 million. The new pathway created a route in compliance with the Americans with Disabilities Act of 1990 between Berkeley and its Marina and waterfront park region. Prior to its construction, the only wheelchair accessible route was via an undercrossing  to the north. Bicycles and pedestrians alternately use a path and stairwell that ran under and along the University Avenue freeway overpass.

Since opening, the bridge has seen a much higher use than the previous path and stairwell. The National Bicycle Greenway has used it since 2003 in its Oakland to Berkeley Mayors' Ride.

See also

References

 Berkeley Daily Planet, February 28, 2002

External links

 Consulting firm's web page
 
 Photos of the opening

Bridges completed in 2002
Buildings and structures in Berkeley, California
Interstate 80
Pedestrian bridges in California
Through arch bridges in the United States
2002 establishments in California
Bridges in Alameda County, California
San Francisco Bay Trail
Bridges on the Interstate Highway System
Cyclist bridges in the United States
Articles with WikiMiniAtlas displaying incorrectly; WMA not showing route